"Better" is a song by English singer-songwriter Zayn. It was released on 25 September 2020 through RCA Records as the lead single from his third studio album, Nobody Is Listening (2021). He wrote the song with its producer, Philip von Boch Scully, alongside Lucky Daye, Dustin Bowie, Michael McGregor, and Cole Citrenbaum. The song marks his first and only release of the year.

Commercial performance
"Better" has sold 200,000 units in the US as of 23 June 2021.

Release and promotion
On 23 September 2020, Zayn teased "Better" in a small teaser video, which features a small clip of the beginning of the official music video. On the following day, he revealed the song's artwork on Twitter.

Music video
The music video for "Better" was directed by Ryan Hope and released along with the song on 25 September 2020.

Charts

Certifications

References

 

2020 songs
2020 singles
Zayn Malik songs
Songs written by Zayn Malik